The canton of Montceau-les-Mines is an administrative division of the Saône-et-Loire department, eastern France. It was created at the French canton reorganisation which came into effect in March 2015. Its seat is in Montceau-les-Mines.

It consists of the following communes:
Montceau-les-Mines
Saint-Berain-sous-Sanvignes

References

Cantons of Saône-et-Loire